{{Infobox television
| alt_name           = Dining Together
| image              = Let's Eat Dinner Together.jpg
| caption            = Promotional poster
| genre              = 
| writer             = {{hlist|Shin Yeo-jin|Kwon Kyung-hyun|Ha Kyung-hwa|Nam Eun-kyung|Yang Soo-hwa|Jo Hye-joo|Shin Yoo-jin|Yoon Da-jeong<ref name="production">[http://tv.jtbc.joins.com/plan/pr10010436 Let's Eat Dinner Togethers production team on JTBC official website]</ref>}}
| starring           = 
| executive_producer = Yoon Hyun-joon
| producer           = 
| country            = South Korea
| language           = Korean
| runtime            = 100 minutes
| picture_format     = 1080i
| company            = JTBC
| network            = JTBC, JTBC2
| first_aired        = 
| last_aired         = 
| num_episodes       = 164
| list_episodes      = List of Let's Eat Dinner Together episodes
}}Let's Eat Dinner Together, also known as Dining Together''', is a South Korean television program starring Lee Kyung-kyu and Kang Ho-dong. This is a documentary-like program that traces the journey of two men who have been called as "National MCs" (due to their appearances on many South Korean entertainment programs) in finding dinner. It is also the first collaboration between the duo since Kang's entry into the entertainment industry. It began airing on JTBC starting from October 19, 2016.

Background 
200 years ago,  wandered around Joseon and felt hungry, people were willing to share food together. 200 years later, in 2016, Kim Sat-gat is no longer alive, and the people living in the city no longer talk about the stories or the food. Instead, what makes people open their mouth are smartphones, SNS (social networking service), message boards, divination and one more thing, spoons.

People eat where, when, with whom and how; two hungry men plan on finding people who can have dinner with them. They press your doorbell, they are just curious about your dinner, let them listen to your story and let them become your family's members. Will you open the door for them?

Format
There are few parts to the show and in completing the main mission, there are rules to follow.

Rules
There are no fixed rules given by production team but the cast in episode 1 had set the following rules and respected them which are as follows:
Press the doorbell only from 18:00 (winter) or 18:30 (summer) to 20:00.
Do not return a second time to the same house which had rejected them before.
Do not eat anything given free by citizen on road (few exceptions exist like in episode 47, the members/guests accepted grapes).
Do not tell any people before 18:00 that will come back later. (i.e. no pre-arranged families are allowed)
Can insist maximum three times if people refuse. (Original on episode 1: Do not insist if people refuse)
Go to another family if any family member is uncomfortable about the shooting.
Do not enter a family which already had dinner.
The above rules also apply if they discover a celebrity's residence or a celebrity as a civilian (e.g. Seohyun on ep. 121 where her family house was discovered, and her car was discovered in 2017 when she was a civilian.)

Introduction of location and guests
The hosts will start from a specific place and then proceed to the neighbourhood they are tasked to have dinner. The production team will give the hosts the mission they have to complete which usually reads: "With a spoon on hand, go to (a selected place) and request to have dinner with a family". Some additional details may be given such as on how to get to the destination (usually by walking / public transport). They may also be given clues to find their guests at a specific location. The production team will also offer the each cast member a same amount of money for travel or snacks during the day.

The cast will then proceed to find if there are any guests which will be joining them for dinner and the guest will be introduced. The guest/s are selected by the production team to join the cast as someone whom, if they rang our doorbell, we would really want to share a meal with. There are some episodes which the sequence is changed (i.e. the guests are found first and introduced and then given the mission card together with the cast members).

The cast will also give a brief introduction to the location as they move through the neighbourhood which may include introducing the beautiful sceneries, the culture and how the place got its name. Some short interviews may also be conducted with local residents to understand the neighbourhood better. In addition, the cast will usually enter a realtor office to find up more about the locality and obtain useful information such as the housing types (apartments, villas, or houses) as well as demographics which may influence the success or failure of the mission. At times, some famous personalities will be mentioned having a house in the region by the realtor also.

The cast will also recce the location and may identify some houses they will like to visit later.

Completion of the main mission
When the time for ringing bells starts, the cast will then decide how to team up for the mission. If there is no guest or only one guest is there, the members do the mission together with guest. If there are two guests, they can do the mission by team (member / guest, or member / member, or guest / guest) in the same area but with different families, or together with same family.

They will then start to ring the doorbells of households. Mission is deemed to be success if before 20:00, a family (with all members allowing) permits the cast members to go inside and have dinner with the entire family, talk and then take together a family photo which will also be presented to the families afterwards. A photo of the dinner that the cast had will also be taken as proof of mission success.

Mission is deemed to be a failure if they fail to do so. The cast will then head to a convenience store nearby to have a dinner with a local resident who is eating dinner in the store and use the rest of the money to buy their own dinner. They will still take a picture together and share lesser stories. This is deemed to be partial failure. After 21:30, if they still cannot find a resident to eat with, it will be a complete failure'' and the cast/guest cannot eat anything at all for the day.

Before the cast members join the dinner table of any family, there is a segment called "Dinner Theater" when the family's members will take their dinner as per their daily normal routine for around two or three minutes. After dinner, there is another segment called "Compliments and Disappointments" when the family's members tell three compliments and three disappointments about each other. In few episodes, there is also segment where video messages are sent from family members to their extended family or loved ones. At times, the cast will also provide token of appreciation to the host family. The cast will also wash the plates for the meal and share final thoughts (in the epilogue of the episode when title credits are shown).

List of episodes

Ratings
In the table below,  represent the lowest ratings and  represent the highest ratings.

2016

2017

2018

2019

2020

Cancellation of broadcasting

References

External links
 
 on JTBC Worldwide

Korean-language television shows
JTBC original programming
2016 South Korean television series debuts
2020 South Korean television series endings
South Korean variety television shows
South Korean reality television series
South Korean cooking television series
Television productions suspended due to the COVID-19 pandemic